Marcel Rasquin is a Venezuelan film director. He directed the 2010 film Hermano. The film won the Golden  George at the Moscow International Film Festival and was selected as the Venezuelan entry for the Best Foreign Language Film at the 83rd Academy Awards, but didn't make the final shortlist. Rasquin is in a relationship with actress

References

https://www.nytimes.com/2012/08/24/movies/hermano-about-soccer-as-refuge-directed-by-marcel-rasquin.html

https://www.hollywoodreporter.com/review/hermano-film-review-71591

https://www.sundance.org/blogs/what-to-watch-this-hispanic-heritage-month

External links

Living people
Year of birth missing (living people)
Venezuelan film directors